This is a list of some notable people affiliated with Sewanee: The University of the South.

Arts

Literature
 Franklin Burroughs, author
 H.T. Kirby-Smith, author and poet
 Thomas Lakeman, author 
 Andrew Nelson Lytle, author, editor, Sewanee Review 
 Aaron McCollough, poet
 Speer Morgan, novelist, short story writer and editor
 William Alexander Percy, poet and memoirist 
 Wyatt Prunty, poet and founding director of the Sewanee Writer's Conference
 John Jeremiah Sullivan, writer and editor, author of Pulphead
 Allen Tate, poet, critic, assistant editor of Sewanee Review 
 Bertram Wyatt-Brown, historian, author

Music
 Radney Foster, singer/songwriter
 Jonathan Meiburg, musician
 Tupper Saussy, American composer, musician
 Amanda Shires, singer/songwriter, violin player

Photography
 Stephen Alvarez, photojournalist and National Geographic photographer

Television and film
 Julian Adams, film producer, writer, and actor
 Paul Harris Boardman, film producer and screenwriter
 Anson Mount, stage, film, and television actor, Hell on Wheels
 John Swasey, voice actor
 Jean Yarbrough, film and television director

Athletics

 Walter Barrett
 Chigger Browne
 Eric Cheape
 Wild Bill Claiborne
 Rupert Colmore
 Harris G. Cope
 Charlie Dexter, Major League Baseball player
 Frank Faulkinberry
 Jenks Gillem
 Delmas Gooch
 Joe B. Hall, University of Kentucky head basketball coach
 Orin Helvey
 Frank Juhan
 Aubrey Lanier
 Lawrence Markley
 Henry D. Phillips
 Kyle Rote Jr.,  soccer player
 Phil Savage, former Senior VP and General Manager, Cleveland Browns
 John Scarbrough
 Henry Seibels, captain of 1899 Sewanee Tigers football team
 John Shoop, football coach
 Ormond Simkins
 Lee Tolley
 Silas Williams
 Warbler Wilson
 Eben Wortham, All-Southern fullback in 1917

Education

 Douglass Adair, historian and editor of the William and Mary Quarterly
 Alan P. Bell, psychologist at the Kinsey Institute
 Benjamin B. Dunlap, president of Wofford College
 John V. Fleming, professor emeritus at Princeton University
 Rayid Ghani, professor of Machine Learning and Public Policy at Carnegie Mellon University and Chief Scientist, Obama for America 2012 Campaign
 W. Cabell Greet (1901-1972), philologist and McIntosh Professor of English at Barnard College
 Thomas N.E. Greville (1910-1998), mathematician and professor at University of Wisconsin-Madison
 J. G. de Roulhac Hamilton (1878-1961), historian, archivist, and professor at the University of North Carolina at Chapel Hill
 Jeff McMahan (philosopher), White's Professor of Moral Philosophy, University of Oxford
 Charles H. McNutt, archaeologist and professor at Memphis State University
 Richard Mitchell, "The Underground Grammarian"
 Walter Nance, professor of Human Genetics at Virginia Commonwealth University
 Eric Woodfin Naylor (1936-2019), Hispanist and translator of el Libro de buen amor
 Samuel F. Pickering Jr., professor of English at the University of Connecticut; inspiration for Mr. Keating in the film Dead Poets Society
 Douglas Porch, professor at the Naval Postgraduate School
 S. Lynne Stokes, statistician and professor at Southern Methodist University
 Richard Tillinghast, English teacher and poet
 Bertram Wyatt-Brown, historian and professor at the University of Florida and Case Western University

Journalism
 Clarence Faulk, publisher of Ruston Daily Leader; owner of radio station KRUS; diversified businessman in Ruston, Louisiana 
 Ward Greene (1892-1956), journalist, playwright and editor
 Smith Hempstone, journalist and U.S. Ambassador to Kenya
 Jack Hitt, author and contributing editor of New York Times Magazine, Harper's Magazine and This American Life
 Roger Hodge, editor of The Oxford American; former editor of Harper's Magazine
 Jon Meacham, editor of Newsweek; winner of 2009 Pulitzer Prize for biography

Law
 Phelan Beale, lawyer of Grey Gardens fame
 Stuart Bowen, Special Inspector General for Iraq Reconstruction, 2004-2013
 Robert L. Brown, Associate Justice Arkansas Supreme Court
 Alexander Campbell King, Solicitor General of the United States and Judge of United States Court of Appeals for the Fifth Circuit
 Benjamin Franklin Cameron (1890-1964), Judge of the United States Court of Appeals for the Fifth Circuit
 Thorn Lord, lawyer and Democratic politician from New Jersey
 Hart T. Mankin, General Counsel of the Navy, 1971-1973, and Judge of the United States Court of Appeals for Veterans Claims, 1990-1996
 Travis Randall McDonough, United States District Judge, Eastern District of Tennessee
 Patrick Henry Nelson II (1856–1914) South Carolina Fifth Circuit Solicitor; President of the South Carolina Bar (1911–1912); member of the South Carolina House of Representatives (1885–1887)
 David C. Norton, United States District Judge, District of South Carolina
 Pride Tomlinson (1890-1967), Justice of the Tennessee Supreme Court

Military
 Archibald Butt (1865–1912), journalist, military advisor to the President
 William Crawford Gorgas (1854–1920), Surgeon General of the US Army
 Cary T. Grayson (1878-1938), naval surgeon, rear admiral, chairman of the American Red Cross
 Frank Kelso (1933–2013), admiral, USN, Chief of Naval Operations (CNO)
 Marcel Lettre, Under Secretary of Defense for Intelligence, 2015-2017
 Leonidas Polk, Episcopal bishop and Confederate general; founder of the University of the South
 Bill Studeman, admiral, U.S. Navy, director of Naval Intelligence, director of the National Security Agency,

Business
 O. B. Grayson Hall Jr., chairman and chief executive officer of Regions Financial Corporation
 Robert Ivy, FAIA, Chief Executive Officer of the American Institute of Architects
 David Tallichet, restaurateur and creator of the themed restaurant
 Rick Woodward, president Woodward Iron Company, owner Birmingham Barons

Politics and Government
 Robert Stanley Adams (1895-1943), member of the Florida State Senate
 Ellis Arnall, governor of Georgia
 Richard Walker Bolling, Democratic congressman from Missouri
 David Cadman, Vancouver City Councillor
 Harry P. Cain, Republican Senator from Washington, 1946-1953
 William S. Cogswell Jr., member of the South Carolina House of Representatives
 Carl Copeland Cundiff, United States Ambassador to Niger
 Steven Dickerson, Republican member of the Tennessee Senate, 2013-2020
 Tucker Eskew, Republican political consultant
 Kirkman Finlay Jr., mayor of Columbia, South Carolina, 1978-1986
 Robert C. Frasure, first United States Ambassador to Estonia after regaining independence from the Soviet Union
 Kenneth Goodenow, member of the Hawaii House of Representatives, 1996-2000
 Robert E. Gribbin, 3rd, United States Ambassador to Rwanda, 1996-1999, and the Central African Republic, 1993-1995.
 William Pike Hall Sr., state senator for Caddo and DeSoto parishes, Louisiana, 1924–1932; Shreveport attorney
 Clarke Hogan, Republican member of the Virginia House of Delegates, 2002-2010
 Henry F. Holland, Assistant Secretary of State for Inter-American Affairs, 1954-1956
 John Jay Hooker (1930-2016), attorney, political gadfly, candidate for Tennessee governor
 Luke Lea, Democratic Senator from Tennessee, 1911-1917
 Peter O'Donnell, Republican state party chairman in Texas during the 1960s; Dallas investor and philanthropist
LeRoy Percy was an attorney, planter, and politician in Mississippi. In 1910, he was elected by the state legislature to the US Senate and served until 1913.
 Vail M. Pittman, 19th Governor of Nevada
 Albert J. Pullen, member of the Wisconsin State Senate
 Simon Pierre Robineau, member of the Florida House of Representatives
 Steve Schale, State Director for the 2008 Barack Obama campaign in Florida 
 Armistead I. Selden Jr., Democratic congressman from Alabama
 Phil Smith (1931-2020), member of the Alabama House of Representatives
 Lee M. Thomas, Administrator, United States Environmental Protection Agency, 1985-89
 Ralph T. Troy (Class of 1957), mayor of Monroe, Louisiana, 1972–1976 
 Shannon R. Valentine, member of the Virginia House of Delegates
 John Sharp Williams (1854-1932), Minority Leader of the United States House of Representatives, U.S. Senator from Mississippi

Religion

 Reginald Heber Weller, (1857-1935), Episcopal priest and bishop active in the ecumenical movement
 George Townshend, (1876-1957), Archdeacon of Clonfert, Canon of St Patrick’s Cathedral, Dublin, Hand of the Cause of the Bahá’í Faith
J. Neil Alexander, bishop of Atlanta and dean of the School of Theology of The University of the South
 John Maury Allin, 23rd presiding bishop of the Episcopal Church, 1974-1985
 Harry Brown Bainbridge III, Bishop of Idaho, President of Province VIII, Chair of Episcopal Relief & Development
 Allen L. Bartlett, Bishop of Pennsylvania, 1987-1998
 Foley Beach, archbishop of the Anglican Church in North America
G.P. Mellick Belshaw (1928-2020), bishop of New Jersey
 Mark Bourlakas, bishop of Southwestern Virginia
 Theodore DuBose Bratton, Bishop of the Episcopal Church and chaplain general of the United Confederate Veterans
 Edmond Browning, presiding bishop of the Episcopal Church
 William G. Burrill, bishop of Rochester
 Charles Judson Child Jr., bishop of Atlanta
 Thomas N. Carruthers (1900-1960), bishop of South Carolina
 William Stirling Claiborne (1872–1933), priest
 Clarence Alfred Cole (1909-1963), bishop of Upper South Carolina
 Glenda S. Curry, bishop of Alabama
 Carl P. Daw Jr., executive director of the Hymn Society
 Alex D. Dickson, bishop of West Tennessee
 William Porcher DuBose, dean and priest
 James Duncan, bishop of Southeast Florida
 Chip Edgar (born 1964), bishop of South Carolina
 Hunley Elebash (1923-1993), bishop of East Carolina
 Thomas C. Ely, bishop of Vermont, 2001-2019
 Leopold Frade, Episcopal bishop
 Robert F. Gibson Jr., bishop of Virginia, 1961-1974
 Campbell Gray, Episcopal bishop
 Duncan M. Gray Jr. (1926–2016), bishop of Mississippi
 Marion J. Hatchett, liturgical scholar and one of the key framers of the 1979 Book of Common Prayer
 John E. Hines, 22nd Presiding Bishop of the Episcopal Church, 1965-1974
 George Nelson Hunt, III, bishop of Rhode Island
 T. J. Johnston (born 1956), bishop in the Anglican Mission in America
 Edwin M. Leidel Jr.,  bishop of Eau Claire
 Clark Lowenfield (born 1957), bishop of the Western Gulf Coast
 Mary Adelia Rosamond McLeod, bishop of Vermont, the first female Episcopal priest elected to head a diocese
 C. Brinkley Morton, bishop of San Diego
 Alfred C. Marble Jr. (1936-2017), bishop of Mississippi
 Henry N. Parsley, bishop of Alabama, chancellor of The University of the South
 Leonidas Polk, Episcopal bishop and Confederate general; founder of the University of the South
 Charles Todd Quintard, bishop of Tennessee
 George Lazenby Reynolds (1927-1991), bishop of Tennessee
 Gene Robinson, bishop of New Hampshire
 Harry W. Shipps, bishop of Georgia
 Becca Stevens, Episcopal priest
 Hudson Stuck, Anglican Archdeacon who organized the first ascent of Mount McKinley
 Eugene Sutton, bishop of Maryland
 G. Porter Taylor, bishop of Western North Carolina
 John Moore Walker Jr., bishop of Atlanta
 Gretchen Rehberg, bishop of Episcopal Diocese of Spokane
 Royden Yerkes, professor of Theology 1935 to 1947

References

Lists of people by university or college in Tennessee